Ernst Brenner (9 December 1856 – 11 March 1911) was a Swiss politician.

He was elected to the Federal Council of Switzerland on 25 March 1897 and died in office on 11 March 1911. He was affiliated to the Free Democratic Party. 

During his office time he held the following departments:
 Department of Justice and Police (1897–1900)
 Political Department as President of the Confederation (1901)
 Department of Justice and Police (1902–1907)
 Political Department as President of the Confederation (1908)
 Department of Justice and Police (1909–1911)

External links 
 
 

1856 births
1911 deaths
Politicians from Basel-Stadt
Swiss Calvinist and Reformed Christians
Free Democratic Party of Switzerland politicians
Foreign ministers of Switzerland
Members of the Federal Council (Switzerland)
Members of the National Council (Switzerland)
Presidents of the National Council (Switzerland)
University of Basel alumni